The Riverside–Delanco Bridge is a truss bridge with a central swing span that carries CR 543 across the Rancocas Creek, between Riverside and Delanco in New Jersey. The current bridge was built in 1934-1935 to replace the 1901 bridge, which itself replaced an 1870 structure. It is currently managed by the Burlington County Bridge Commission.

External links 
Riverside-Delanco Bridge, Burlington County Bridge Commission

Swing bridges in the United States
Bridges completed in 1935
Bridges in Burlington County, New Jersey
Road bridges in New Jersey